Black Lolita is a 3D blaxploitation film directed by Stephen Gibson. It was released in 1975 under that title. Some time later, new footage was added to create another film, which was released under the title of Wildcat Women. It is about a singer who returns to her home town to fight the gangsters who have taken it over. It stars Yolanda Love, Ed Cheatwood, Susan Ayers and Joey Ginza.

Premise
A beautiful singer whose career is on the rise finds out that her relatives are being harassed by criminals. She returns to her hometown to take revenge on them. She puts together a team to take them on, and Buddha, the criminal boss who murdered her uncle, from whom he was trying to extort money.

Background
The film is also called Bad Lolita, and was released in 1975. The original was released in 3D. It was announced in the January 20, 1975 issue of Box that the film was possibly the first black action movie to be filmed in 3D and that it was scheduled to open in Chicago in the near future.

At the time when the film was made, Blaxploitation films were still very popular. Producer / director Stephen Gibson thought that some other films of that genre, like the Rudy Ray Moore films, weren't that good, and he thought he could work in that area as long as he delivered. He didn't do enough market research, and the film sank. The film played at Detroit's Grand Circus theater where popcorn was thrown at the screen and seats were damaged. Because he owned the picture, Gibson only had to worry about getting back his own money. He decided to change the title and shoot extra footage and other footage to add the story. The finished product was a different film altogether. It was called Wildcat Women. Black Lolita and Wildcat Women are actually two different films.

Music
The music for the film was composed by Joe Greene, Marva Farmer and Steve Dexter. Additional music was provided by The Charades. The two songs they contributed were the title song and the love theme

Screenings
The film was screened at the Plaza in Detroit in June 1975, and was doubled with Quadroon, which explored the status of mixed-race women in early 1800s New Orleans. Also in Detroit, it screened at the Grand Circus where it didn't do well.

Cast and crew

Cast
 Lolita ...  Yolanda Love
 Ed Cheatwood  ... Cleon 
 Joey Ginza ... Buddha 
 Susan Ayres ... Robbie 
 Judy Williams ... Shirley 
 Zenobia Wittacre  ... Pearl
 Larry Ellis ... Tinker

Crew
 Richard Albain Sr ... Special effects
 Mike Brown  ... Story and screenplay
 Steve Dexter ... Muisic
 Thomas L. Fisher ... Special effects
 Stephen Gibson ... Director, producer, story and screenplay
 Arnold Herr  ... Camera assistant
 Parker Johnson  ... Executive producer
 Jef Richard ... Production manager
 Bruce Scott ... Sound

References

External links
 Imdb: Black Lolita
 Turner Classic Movies: Black Lolita

1970s 3D films
Blaxploitation films
1975 crime drama films
American crime drama films
African-American films
1975 films
1970s English-language films
1970s American films
Mockbuster films